Divorce mill is a term used for a jurisdiction that is typically used for divorces by non-residents and/or used to obtain a divorce quickly and/or allow for contested divorces quickly and with little or no compensation to the other spouse.

Examples
Until 2006, Guam granted mail order divorces.  In 2006 the law was changed to provide that 7 days of physical presence provides residency for divorce when the parties consent to the jurisdiction of the court.  While this may confer personal jurisdiction, there remains a number of questions as to the validity of these divorces for the reason that Guam lacks any state interest in the marital affairs of nonresidents beyond the revenue these quickie divorces generate. 

There are three countries, one US territory, and one US state that could be regarded in this sense. Most of these jurisdictions allow for "irreconcilable differences" divorce without a period of separation, something that is not possible in many places.

Legality

Domicile 

In United States law, the basis of subject-matter jurisdiction in divorce is domicile. Domicile is the place where a person resides with the intent to permanently or at least indefinitely remain. In colloquial terms, it is 'home.' A natural person (i.e. not a corporation), may only have one domicile at a time.
Courts within the United States apply the law of domicile in cases where the divorce was obtained in a US state, territory, the District of Columbia, or a foreign country.

Basis for challenge of divorce by sister state, territory, or D.C.  

The difference between an ex-parte divorce and a bilateral is critical to determining whether a divorce granted by state A (e.g. Nevada) can be collaterally attacked (challenged) as invalid in state B (e.g. North Carolina). 

Where divorce is ex-parte, only one party to marriage appears in the divorcing court. Under Williams v. North Carolina, 325 U.S. 226 (1945), the other spouse can collaterally attack the validity of the ex-parte divorce in another state on grounds that the state granting the divorce didn't have jurisdiction. This involves arguing that the spouse seeking the divorce in that state was not domiciled in that state. 

Where the divorce is bilateral, both parties appear in the divorcing court. Even a special appearance by the defendant spouse is sufficient. Sherrer v. Sherrer, 334 U.S. 343 (1948) bars collateral attack on these divorces because the parties could have argued the issue of domicile (and hence jurisdiction) in the divorcing state. When the issue is brought before the court of the other state, the full faith and credit clause (Article 4, Section 1 of the United States Constitution) requires that state to respect the divorcing court's decision. In effect, the determination made in the divorcing state is res judicata. 

Where that decree was issued in the District of Columbia or a United States territory (e.g. United States Virgin Islands), full faith and credit is applicable via a federal statute, 28 U.S.C. 1738, but not the federal constitution.

Basis for challenge of divorce obtained in a foreign country 

Where a divorce obtained in another country is collaterally attacked (challenged) in a court within the United States, full faith and credit is not an issue. Instead, the court may examine the issue of domicile under the principles of comity.

Famous divorce mills

Jurisdictions famous as divorce mills include (but are not limited to):
 Nevada
 Haiti
 Mexico
 The Dominican Republic
 Guam
 United States Virgin Islands

Nevada
The State of Nevada is commonly used for a few reasons. It only requires a 6-week stay to meet the residency requirements, the second lowest in the United States after Guam. Nevada allows for irreconcilable differences as a grounds for divorce. One major reason this attracts people is it allows for an easy bypassing of the mandatory 50/50 split in some community property states, most notably the adjoining State of California.

Guam
Guam had (and still has some) very attractive reasons for obtaining an uncontested divorce there - reasons that make (or made) it a likely candidate for the title "divorce mill" - a title branded by many of its own politicians in a successful attempt to change the law.

Because Guam is a territory of the United States, its courts are United States jurisdictional courts and the divorces it issues are valid in all of the states in the U.S. Prior to January 1, 2006, Guam allowed for an uncontested divorce without either spouse visiting the territory at all - one of the few places if not the only that allowed this. After being charged as a "divorce mill", an agreement was made by the politicians of the territory with the lawyers and other lobbyists who did not want to change the law, to require a seven-day stay in Guam (as opposed to the much longer ones proposed by the legislators) to obtain a divorce. Guam allows for "irreconcilable differences" as a cause for divorce, and Guam is much quicker to award a finalized divorce than many U.S. states, taking a few weeks at most. Before the law was changed, it was a very attractive alternative for many Americans, as it was also quite affordable. However, with the seven-day stay requirement and its location in Micronesia, a trip there can be very expensive and may not be a viable alternative for many Americans.

See also
 Divorce: Divorces Obtained in a Different Country of Jurisdiction
 Mexican divorce
 The Divorce Colony, Sioux Falls, South Dakota

Divorce